Chang Chang-sun (or Jang Chang-seon, Hangul: 장창선, Hanja: 張昌宣; born June 12, 1942) is a retired South Korean freestyle wrestler. He won a silver medal at the 1964 Summer Olympics and a world title in 1966.

References

External links
 

1942 births
Living people
South Korean wrestlers
Olympic wrestlers of South Korea
Wrestlers at the 1964 Summer Olympics
South Korean male sport wrestlers
Olympic silver medalists for South Korea
Olympic medalists in wrestling
World Wrestling Championships medalists
Hanyang University alumni
Sportspeople from Incheon
Medalists at the 1964 Summer Olympics
Asian Games medalists in wrestling
Wrestlers at the 1962 Asian Games
Asian Games silver medalists for South Korea
Medalists at the 1962 Asian Games
20th-century South Korean people
21st-century South Korean people